Bill Brewer is a British philosopher and Susan Stebbing Professor of Philosophy at King's College London. He was previously the Head of the Department of Philosophy.

He was a scholar at Oriel College, Oxford, reading Maths and Philosophy and graduating B. Phil. and D. Phil in Philosophy, supervised by P. F. Strawson, David Pears, Jennifer Hornsby, and John Campbell. He was then a Research Fellow at King's College, Cambridge, a Tutorial Fellow and University Lecturer at St Catherine's College, Oxford, and next a Professor in the Philosophy Department at the University of Warwick. He has also been a visiting Lecturer at Brown University, Hamburg, and the University of California, Berkeley.

In September 2012, Brewer was elected as the Susan Stebbing Professor of Philosophy at King's College, London.

Books
 Perception and Reason, Oxford University Press, 1999
 Perception and Its Objects, Oxford University Press, 2011

References

External links
Bill Brewer at KCL

20th-century British philosophers
20th-century essayists
21st-century British philosophers
21st-century essayists
Academics of King's College London
Action theorists
Alumni of Oriel College, Oxford
Analytic philosophers
British male essayists
British consciousness researchers and theorists
Date of birth missing (living people)
Epistemologists
Living people
Metaphysicians
Ontologists
Philosophers of mind
Year of birth missing (living people)